Fred Haggerty (14 July 191826 July 2002) was a Hungarian-born British actor and stuntman whose career lasted more than 40 years and took in more than 100 credits on the big and small screen.

Biography 
Fred Haggerty appeared in the films Circus of Horrors, Captain Sindbad and Nuns on the Run. He was often booked as a villain and had a short appearance in the series Law & Order. He also worked as a stuntman and performed stunts in such movies as An American Werewolf in London, Lifeforce, Who Framed Roger Rabbit and many James Bond films.

Partial filmography

Passport to Pimlico (1949) – Man in Crowd (uncredited)
Captain Horatio Hornblower R.N. (1951, Stunts)
The Man in the White Suit (1951) – Mill Worker (uncredited)
Appointment in London (1953) – RAF Officer (uncredited)
The Titfield Thunderbolt (1953) – Townsman (uncredited)
Doctor at Sea (1955) – Released Prisoner (uncredited)
The Cockleshell Heroes (1955) – Marine (uncredited)
The March Hare (1956) – Racegoer (uncredited)
The Battle of the River Plate (1956) – Crewman, Admiral Graf Spee (uncredited)
Up in the World (1956) – Footballer (uncredited)
Town on Trial (1957) – Man at Dance (uncredited)
A Night to Remember (1958, Stunts) – Passenger (uncredited)
The Headless Ghost (1959) – Medieval Ghost (uncredited)
The Mouse That Roared (1959) – Fenwickian (uncredited)
Circus of Horrors (1960) – Second Roustabout (uncredited)
There Was a Crooked Man (1960) – (uncredited)
Tunes of Glory (1960, Stunt coordinator) – Sergeant (uncredited)
Very Important Person (1961) – German Guard (uncredited)
Operation Snafu (1961) – Airman (uncredited)
Captain Sindbad (1963)
The Scarlet Blade (1963) – Soldier (uncredited)
From Russia with Love (1963) – Krilencu
Carry on Spying (1964) – Dr. Crow's Assistant (uncredited)
The Gorgon (1964) – Constable (uncredited)
Casino Royale (1967) – Man in Casino (uncredited)
A Challenge for Robin Hood (1967) – Man at arms (uncredited)
Quatermass and the Pit (1967) – Fleeing Man (uncredited)
The Bunny Caper (1974) – 2nd Guardsman
The Pink Panther Strikes Again (1976) – Munich Hotel Doorman
The Spy Who Loved Me (1977, Stunts) – Stromberg Henchman (uncredited)
Candleshoe (1977) – Hood (uncredited)
Revenge of the Pink Panther (1978) – Attendant (uncredited)
Nuns on the Run (1990) – Gatekeeper (final film role)

References

External links
 

English stunt performers
1918 births
2002 deaths
British actors
Hungarian emigrants to the United Kingdom